There are a number of uncertainties and disputed issues in the early history of Islam.

Most of these disputes can be traced to Shi'a-Sunni disagreements. Shi'a often argue that history has been distorted to further a Banu Umayyad agenda. In many cases, complications with the historiography of early Islam have also resulted in lack of consensus within denominations of Islam.

List of disputed issues

The uncertainties include:
Succession to Muhammad 
The date of birth of Muhammad
The date of Muhammad's death
The age at which Khadija married Muhammad (25–40 years)
The date of birth of Fatimah (±10 years)
The marriage in which three of Khadija's three daughters were born
The number of marriages Khadija was in before marrying Muhammad 
The prohibition of Nikah Mut'ah
Date of birth of Aisha
Identity of the second wife of Muhammad (Sawda bint Zamʿa or Aisha)
Disputes over the identity of the "Umm Khulthum" that married Umar (bint Ali, Bint Abu Bakr or a third)
The existence of Fatimah's third son, Muhsin ibn Ali
The ultimate faith of Abu Talib ibn Abd al-Muttalib.
Mohammad's inheritance and the dispute on the land of Fadak & Khaybar
Burial place of Fatimah
Whether the night ascension (Miʿraj) was a physical journey or a spiritual one.

See also
Timeline of Islamic history
History of Islam

Further reading
 Qur'an and History — a Disputed Relationship: Some Reflections on Qur'anic History and History in the Qur'an / القرآن والتاريخ: علاقة موضع جدل Angelika Neuwirth and ٲنجليکا نيوورث. Journal of Qur'anic Studies. Vol. 5, No. 1 (2003), pp. 1–18. Edinburgh University Press.
 Tayeb El-Hibri, Parable and Politics in Early Islamic History: The Rashidun Caliphs. Columbia University Press, 2010.
 Jóhann Páll Árnason, Civilizations in Dispute: Historical Questions and Theoretical Traditions. BRILL, Jan 1, 2003.
 Régis Blachère, The problem of Muhammad - test critical biography of the founder of Islam, a volume of 135 pages, University Press of France, Paris, 1952.

Notes

References

External links
 Early Troubles in Muslim History, Shia articles at shiabook.blogspot

Historiography of Islam
Arab world-related lists
Islam-related lists
Life of Muhammad